Vishuddhananda Paramahansa or Vishudhananda Paramahansa (Bengali:: Bishuddhananda Pôromôhongśo) (14 March 1853 – 14 July 1937) popularly known as Gandha Baba ('The perfume saint') was an Indian yogi, guru, and spiritual master. He spend 12 years in Gyangunj in intense spiritual practice including meditation. He was well-known for spiritual powers which he learnt while staying in Gyangunj. Vishuddhananda later adopted life of a householder yet achieved perfect samadhi. He was born as 'Bholanath Chattopadhaya' to Shri Akhil Chandra Chattopadhaya and Srimati Raj Rajeshswari Chattopadhaya in a remote village named BONDUL currently at Bardhaman district in India to pious Brahmin Bengali family.

Early life
At about 13 years age Bholanath was ones bitten by a mad dog. His health deteriorated despite of the best efforts by the local physicians, it was perceived that his was going to die with a few days. Bholanath felt the excruciating pain, pain so intolerable, he wanted to alleviate it by submerging to death on the depths of the Ganges. With the thought of ending his life in the Ganges he went to the banks of the Ganga. There he saw a sage taking a bath in Ganges. To his amazement he saw that the water column would rise up as the sage rose up from the water. The sage took notice of young Bholanath and inquired about him. The sage then blessed Bholanath by touching his palm on his head. Instantly Bholanath could feel the relief, the excruciating pain is gone, he was feeling much better. The sage then searched for a special herb in the river bank and asked him to have it. He assured him that the herb would nullify the effects of the dog bite and all the poison would be excreted out through his urine. Next day,he then taught him a yogic posture and gave him a mantra. He told him that he is not his guru but advised him to practice the yogic posture and meditate the mantra. He also told him that one day he would become a great yogi and advised him to return home.

Travel to Gyanganj
Two years passed by yet there was no trace of the Sanyasi. Bholanath used to visit a shop in Burdwan market for purchasing day-to-day requirements. One day he overheard a story about a strange Sanyasi amidst a conversation between two people one of them came from Dhaka to Burdwan.They spoke about a monk with mystic display wherein a pile of water coloumn from river would raise up to touch sage's hand during evening prayer. Young Bholanath intrigued could recall his early memory on how a holy hermit saved him from dog bite. He coveted to meet the Sanyasi.He pleaded the gentleman from Dhaka to take him to the holy monk. He seemed to concur on one condition, only if young Bholanath could convince her mother & bring her consent. To obtain his mother’s permission he went to Bandul with his friend Haripada. Bholanath's mother discerned that her son would only live for mere 22 years as predicted by astrology. In the hope that Bholanath would survive longer, she approved adolescent Bholanath's visit to Dhaka to meet the Yogi.On reaching their destination they met the Sanyasi in the morning. Bholanath reverently made obeisance and his friend Haripada did the same. Bholanath prayed the Sanyasi to take him along with him this time as promised earlier. On inquiry Bholanath explained to the Sanyasi that Haripada was an intimate friend of his and he too was very earnest to stay with and under the guidance of the Sanyasi was no other than the great Siddha Yogi Swami Nimanand Paramahansa of the secret Gyanganj Yogashram in Tibet. He asked them both to come to him in the evening. It is only through the Almighty’s extreme grace and compassion that one out of a million succeed in their goal of self-realization which these two youths, Bholanath and Haripada, set for themselves that day. All set for the great journey to Gyanganj, the Sanyasi asked them to confirm if they were still keen to accompany him which they did without the slightest hesitation. He once again emphatically reiterated to them all the pit-falls, difficulties and sufferings likely to be encountered on the way. Thereupon, Swami Nimanand tied cloth bandages on the eyes of each so that they could not see anything. Holding one on either side by each hand, he let them over forested hills and plains by air route. Swami Nimananda aforesaid both of the youngsters not to speak anything or to get afraid either while travelling. The two felt as if they were walking on a smooth silken carpet. By morning the first lap of the journey was covered. Their bandages were removed and they found themselves on top of a barren hillock on which stood a grand temple, surrounded by hill ranges on all its four sides. They realized that they had reached some place far away from Bengal. On enquiry they found that they were at the temple of Vindhya-Vasini Ahsta-Bhuja Devi in Vindhyachal town in the district of Mirzapur in Uttar Pradesh state of India. From Dhaka in East Bengal they had thus traversed the states of West Bengal and Bihar and a part of Uttar Pradesh – a stretch of about a thousand kilometres – during the course of a single night. This occurrence enhanced their esteem and respect for Swami Nimanand many fold. The Sanyasi then asked the two boys to stay there free from fear as no wild beast would harm them and not to lose heart till his return to take them on to the Ashram. So saying he suddenly vanished before their very eyes. A week passed before the Sanyasi arrived again to take them. He disclosed his name to them as Swami Nimananda paramahansa. As before, he tied bandages over their eyes and took them both with him to an Ashram situated amongst a cluster of hills about twenty kilometres away from Vindyachal, where some saints were residing. He left the two children at this Ashram and himself went away to some other place. He returned after another five days and this time took the children with him by the air route. On reaching the destination the bandages were taken off their eyes. They found that it was morning and they had reached a charming celestial place on a plain surrounded on allsides by snow-covered high hill ranges, calm, majestic and peaceful. On inquiry, they were told by Swami Nimanand, "This is the normally inaccessible and secret Yogashram situated in the midst of the mid-asian highlands, Tibet, known by the name of Gyanganj Yogashram. After a stay of nine to ten days at the Ashram, Bholanath and Haripada were both presented by Swami Nimanand before His Reverent Holiness Shri Mahatapa, for initiation. Shri Mahatapa first transmitted spiritual energy into each one of them by placing his hand on their heads and thereafter gave Bij-mantra to each of them. Both of them thus became Guru Bhais (Brother Disciple) of Swami Nimanand, who was an earlier disciple of Mahatapa Maharaj. At Gyanganj Vishuddhanadaji learnt Surya Vigyan(Solar Science), Chandra Vigyan(Moon Science), Nakshatra Vigyan(Star Science), Vayu Vigyan(Air Science) Swar Vigyan(Sound Science) & Dev Vigyan(God Science).

Famous Meetings

Meeting with Paramhansha Yogananda
When Paramahansa Yogananda visited Vishuddhananda Paramahansaji, Paramahanshaji displayed some of him astral power to create purfumes. Below is the excerpt from chapter 5 of the Autobiography of a Yogi
"Mr. Philosopher, you please my mind. Now, stretch forth your right hand." 
He made a gesture of blessing. I was a few feet away from Gandha Baba; no one else was near enough to contact my body. I extended my hand, which the yogi did not touch.
"What perfume do you want?"
"Rose."
"Be it so."
To my great surprise, the charming fragrance of rose was wafted strongly from the center of my palm. I smilingly took a large white scentless flower from a nearby vase.
"Can this odorless blossom be permeated with jasmine?"
"Be it so."
A jasmine fragrance instantly shot from the petals. I thanked the wonder-worker and seated myself by one of his students. He informed me that Gandha Baba, whose proper name was Vishudhananda, had learned many astonishing yoga secrets from a master in Tibet.

Meeting with Paul Brunton
Dr. Paul Brunton was a British journalist. He travelled through Tibet, India, Egypt and many other countries, collecting the mysteries of the saints of these countries. Below is an excerpt from his book A Search in Secret India.

The Great Yogi of Varanasi
One day, I went out visiting places in Varanasi on foot. Of course, I had a purpose behind walking the circuitous lanes. I had the address of a Yogi in Varanasi in my pocket, given to me by a disciple of his, whom I met in Bombay. Accordingly, I followed the main road and arrived at the gate of a sprawling building. On one pillar of the gate was embedded a small marble stone bearing the name "Vishuddhanand Kanan Ashram". This was the place I was looking for and I walked in. In a hall, I found many well-dressed Indians sitting in a semi-circle on the durrie spread on the floor. Opposite on a bed-stead was seated a grey-bearded Mahatma, with a charming face commanding respect. I knew that I had come to the personage I was in search of.

I saluted him with folded hands and told him that I was a British journalist; I had come on a visit to India, as I was greatly interested in the study of Indian Philosophy and systems of Yoga. I also told him of my meeting a disciple of his, who had given me his address and that I was very keen to converse with him on the above two subjects. Baba directed one of his disciples in Bengali to tell me in English that a conversation would be only be possible if he could bring along Shri Gopinath Kaviraj, Principal, Govt. Sanskrit College, Varanasi with him. Shri Gopinath Kaviraj is well versed in both Bengali and English and is besides an old disciple of his, so he would be able to act as a proper interpreter. "Come with him tomorrow, I shall expect you at 4.00 p.m."

I went to the Sanskrit College but Kaviraj had left for his residence. It took me about half-an-hour to reach his house. I found him there in a double-storeyed old house. He was sitting on the floor in his room on the first storey, surrounded by books on all sides with paper, ink and pen at his side for writing. His face exuded culture and civility. I explained to him the purpose of my visit. After initial hesitation, he finally agreed to take me to Baba the next day at the appointed hour. Next day by 4 p.m. I reached Baba’s ashram along with Kaviraj ji. On entry into the big hall we paid obeissance to Baba. There were another six disciples already present in the hall. Swamiji asked me to sit near him.

Baba’s first question was, "Do you want to see some miracles?"

I – "Yes, sir, this was my first desire."

He directed Kaviraj ji to tell me in English to give him my handkerchief, preferably of silk. Luckily I had a silk one with me which I gave. He brought out a magnifying glass and said, "I will focus the rays of the sun on the handkerchief with the help of this magnifying glass but as the sun is not bright enough and there is darkness in the room also, I doubt if the experiment will be fully successful. If somebody could go out in the open and reflect the rays of the sun into the room, the job could be done more easily. Whichever scent you want I shall produce. So, indicate your preference."

I – "Can you produce the fragrance of Bela flower?"

Swamiji held my handkerchief in his left hand and focussed the Sun’s rays on to it for a couple of minutes. Then he laid down the magnifying glass and returned the hankie to me. It was full of Bela fragrance. I examined the handkerchief very carefully. There was no sign of wetness anywhere on it, to indicate sprinkling of any scent on it. I was wonder struck and kept gazing at Swamiji in a dubious manner with half-opened eyes for quite a time. But he was prepared for yet another test. This time I asked for the scent of a rose. He started the process again and I watched him very attentively this time; including all the movements of his hands and feet to see if there was anything close-by which could be used, and I missed nothing at all. I even watched his arms and open deceit-less clothing but could not discern any chance of hanky-panky. Like before, he repeated the process and returned the handkerchief to me with its other corner exiding copiously the sweet smell of a rose this time. Third time I asked for the fragrance of violet and he produced the same, with my eyes glued to the movements to see if there was any sleigh of hand etc. involved.

The Swamiji showed no elation at all. He did not consider these miracles to be of any significant importance, and his face did not exhibit any emotion excitement.

Then he suddenly said, "Now I shall produce the scent of a unique flower, which blossoms in Tibet only."

On the fourth corner of my kerchief which till yet remained unfragranted, he focussed the rays of the sun through his magnifying glass. A very sweet fragrance, the like of which I had never smelt ever before, started filling my nostrils and the whole room. Finally, I kept the handkerchief securely in my pocket. But my mind was even now not free from doubt. I was thinking, "Maybe he keeps essences of these flowers hidden somewhere in his garments; but then how many essences can he keep hidden? Also how would he know which particular scent one may ask for? Besides he never, even for once, put his hand anywhere even close to his clothes."

I required his permission to examine his magnifying glass, which was readily given. It was like any other one. The glass was held in a twined-wire frame and the handle was also of twisted wire. So there was no room for any doubt even there. Besides, I was not alone watching the production. Another six or seven people were all attentively on the look out to catch any sleigh hand etc. Kaviraj ji assured me that the Yogiraj was a truthful person of very high ideals and sublime thoughts and stooping to trickery of any sort was absolutely foreign to his very nature. Then, could it be a case of hypnotism? If that be so, it can easily be found. On reaching my hotel, I shall show it to my other friends. They would check it. And I did have it checked. I gave my handkerchief to three different people. Each one testified to the presence of the various fragrances on each of the four corners.

Thus I could no longer pass off this event lightly as a joke nor could I classify it as a hallucination, magic or hypnotism.

Reviving dead creature
The next question that arose in my mind was, "Can the Yogiraj impart life to a dead creature?"

The next time that I visited Swamiji, he himself said, "Today I shall enliven a dead bird before you through Surya-Yijnan (Solar Science)."

And lo, a small sparrow which was till now flying about in the hall, suddenly dropped dead. It was allowed to lie there for a whole one hour so that we could get convinced that it was really dead. Its eyes were fixed and there was no movement at all of any limb of the bird. The whole body had become tense and there was not a sign to suggest any chance of life in it. The Yogiraj then took out his magnifying glass and focussed the rays of the Sun on to the eyes of the sparrow, simultaneously repeating a Mantra. In a little while, the dead sparrow started movement. Then the movement became violent as if a dying dog were kicking its limbs. Later, the wings started fluttering. In a few more minutes, the sparrow stood up on its legs and once it gained a little strength it started darting around in the room as before. The sparrow kept flying for half-an-hour. I was lost in my own thoughts when it suddenly fell dead once again. There it lay dead without any movement. I examined it carefully. The breathing had stopped completely.

I asked the Yogiraj, "Can you not keep it alive for a longer period?"

He replied, "No, my researches in Surya-Vijnan have not advanced so much yet that I could give it life for a longer period."

Kaviraj Gopinath whispered in my ear that the Yogiraj Vishuddhanand ji expected better results with further experimentation.

I did not like to test him further, like we normally are inclined to do with ordinary magicians. The stories of Baba’s other miracles convinced me about him not being a fake person, but a real Yogi. I learnt that he could produce grapes or sweets out of the blue and transform faded flowers into blooming ones.

I asked him point blank, "What techniques have you employed in bringing about these miracles?"

He replied, "All that you have witnessed so far had nothing to do with Yoga. It is the outcome of Surya-Vijnan."

The purpose of Yoga is, first the inhibition of the modificationls of the mind (Chitta-vritti-nirodha), then concentration (Dharana), and thereafter meditation (Dhyan) and finally contemplation (Samadhi). In Surya-Vijnan all the above are not necessary at all. Surya-Vijnan is an integrationn of some abstruce scientific secrets in nature. It has to be studied and practised in the same way as is done in the western world in respect of phyiscal sciences. Kaviraj ji confirmed this view and said, "Surya-Vijnan depends upon and is connected more intimately with electrical energy and magnetic attraction as compared to other sciences."

I could not catch the point, so Swami Vishuddhanand took over and explained to me as under. "This Surya-Vijnan is nothing new. In ancient times, the Yogis of India were quite adept in this natural science, but now even in India barring a few, most people do not know about it. In a way, it has almost disappeared from India. The rays of the Sun are endowed with life-giving energy. If you could only learn three things, viz. (1) how to separate this energy from the other stuff obtaining in the Sun’s rays, (2) the formula of combination of these energies to form the various articles, and (3) the technique of combining them, then you too would be able to exhibit miracles."

I – "Are you training your disciples in this branch of science?"

Baba – "Not so far, but arrangements are afoot. Only a few deserving disciples would be initiated into this line. At the moment I am in the process of establishing a big laboratory where practical demonstrations of theoretical aspects could be arranged."

I – "Then what are your disciples learning at present?"

Baba – "They are being trained in Yoga."

Then Kaviraj ji took me round the laboratory, which resembled a European house in some respects. It had many storeys, build in a modern style. The walls were made of baked red bricks, with big recesses to take in the big size glass panes in frames, to allow entry to the rays of the sun by reflection through red, blue, green, yellow glasses, crystals and prisms and study their behaviour in various aspects for research purposes. Kaviraj ji told me that glass panes of that size to fit those big recesses, were not being manufactured in any factory in India so far, and hence the construction had to be stopped half-way. He asked me if I could make inquiries in England in that respect, emphasizing that Baba was very particular that the glasses had to be manufactured precisely to his specifications – not minutest variation would be permissible. The particular requirements were that the manufacturers will have to guarantee that the glasses will be meticulously free from air-bubbles, the tinted glasses would be absolutely transparent, and the glasses would be exactly 12 feet by 8 feet inch thick. The laboratory was in the midst of a garden with tall trees all around. A line of tall palmyra trees with luxurious growth of leafy branches kept it concealed from the view of the visitors. After seeing the laboratory-under-construction, I returned and took my seat in front of Swamiji.

By now most of the visitors had left, barring just a couple. For a few moments, Baba gazed at me and then fixed his attention on to the floor.

Suddenly he spoke out, "Till such time I obtain permission from my Guru, I cannot undertake your initiation."

I asked, "Have you read my thoughts? As your Guru stays in the far-off Tibet, in what manner would you be able to obtain the permission?"

He replied, "We have a direct psychic inter-communication between us."

I was listening but not comprehending a bit of what was being said. Even so his sudden remark about my initiation and direct psychic inter-communication set me in deep thought, and I asked, "Sir, how do you achieve this psychic inter-communication?"

Instead of replying to my question directly, Baba put me a counter-question, "Till you practise Yoga, how can you think of inter-communication?"

I kept on thinking about the meaning of all this talk and then said, "But I am told that without a Guru, success in Yoga is a far-cry, one cannot even get started on Yoga. And finding a true Guru is almost an impossibility these days."

Baba’s expression of the countenance showed no change. He kept indifferent and unmoved. He said, "If the aspirant is ready, the Guru will come of his own accord."

When I started my volley of questions, Baba raised his hand and said, "A human being should first prepare himself. Thereafter, no matter where he is, he will find a Guru. If he does not get him in physical form, the Guru will appear in his inner-sight."

I – "How can I start on the sadhana?"

Baba – "Every day at a fixed time, sit for a pre-fixed period on this asan (Padmasan). This will prepare you well for your sadhana.. Be careful to keep control over your passions and anger."

After this, Baba showed me the way one sits on Padmasan. I knew the technique already but what I failed to understand was – how Baba classed this asan, in which the legs have to be twisted so intricately, as simple.

So I said – "How many Europeans would be able to manage this posture for sitting?"

Baba – "In the beginning surely they will experience a little difficulty. But by practising daily in the morning and evening, they will soon get the hang of it. The most important thing in this practice of Yoga is to fix up a time for practice and stick to it under all circumstances. In the beginning start with just five minutes daily in the mornings and evenings. After a month increase it to ten minutes and after three months take it up to twenty. In this way keep on increasing the time. But be very careful that the spine is kept erect. This practice will impart poise and mental peace to the aspirant.

I – "So you are teaching Hatha Yoga."

Baba – "Yes, in a way. But understand that Raja Yoga is slightly superior to Hatha Yoga. Just like a man first thinks and then acts. So also, we have to develop both the body and the mind simultaneously. The body affects the mind and vice-versa. For any practical advancement we cannot divorce one from the other; they have to be developed simultaneously."

After this I bade adieu to the Swamiji and left.

Prophesy on Sri Aurobindo 

Even though Yogirajadhiraj Vishuddhananda Paramhansanji didn't meet Sri Aurobindo, he prophsized about Sri Aurobindo's trial and predicted that nothing would happen to him. Below is an excerpt from the "Talks With Sri Aurobindo Vol 1"

SRI AUROBINDO:But plenty of people can prophesy and among Yogis that capacity is very common. When I was arrested, my maternal grand aunt asked Vishuddhananda, "What will happen to our Auro?" He replied, "The Divine Mother has taken him in her arms: nothing will happen to him. But he is not your Aurobindo, he is the world's Aurobindo and the world will be filled with his perfume."

Meeting Anandamayi Ma 
Anandamoyi Ma met Yogirajadhiraj Vishuddhananda Paramhanshaji sometime on December, 1935 at Varanasi. Anandamoyi Ma accounts her brief meeting with the yogi to one of his bhaktas:
Ma said, "When this time I was coming via Varanasi, I met Babaji, but not for long. Maybe half an hour or an hour at the most. Gopi baba (Gopinath Kaviraj) took us there. Going there, I sat by Babaji. He had already arranged a seat for me. You know the way I speak. I pressed Babaji with child-like importunity, ‘Baba, they say you have shown magical feats to many. Do show me a few, will you?’
Babaji said, ‘You are sitting quietly. Have you discovered any secret?’
I at once posed as a little girl and said, ‘Baba, I am your daughter. What do I know? Shall learn what you would please to teach. Teach me all your secrets?’
Babaji then called Jyotish to him and showed him a crystal which he had made out of the petals of a flower. He also produced a number of scents. When Babaji was demonstrating these things I clapped and said, ‘Baba, I can make out what you are doing. But I shall not divulge it. Then all would say to me, Ma, do tell us the secrets of Babaji. If I do so, Baba would strike me on the head with a cudgel.’
Babaji said, ‘Beti(little girl), what is there that I can show you? You know it all. I am demonstrating only to others.’
Next he brought some sweets and offered us to eat. He fed me and I also did the same with him. Babaji said, ‘Beti, remember me. Never forget me. And whenever you come here make sure to meet me.’
Before I left I said to Gopi Baba (Gopinath Kaviraj), ‘You see, Babaji is deluding you all with these demonstrations. You should not allow him to delude you. Try to elicit from him the other things that he has within him.’

References 

1853 births
1937 deaths
19th-century Hindu religious leaders
19th-century Hindu philosophers and theologians
20th-century Hindu philosophers and theologians
20th-century Hindu religious leaders
Ascetics
Bengali Hindu saints
Bhakti movement
Bengali Hindus
Hindu mystics
Hindu revivalists
Hindu reformers
Spiritual practice
Shaktas
Tantra
Indian Hindu spiritual teachers
Indian Hindu saints
Indian Hindu monks